The Nonsuch 22 is a Canadian trailerable sailboat, the smallest of the series of Nonsuch sailboats. It was designed by Mark Ellis Design and first built in 1984.

The design is a scaled-down development of the original, larger Nonsuch 30.

Production
The design was built by Hinterhoeller Yachts in St. Catharines, Ontario, Canada starting in 1984. It went out of production in about 1990. A total of 58 examples were built before production ended.

Design

The Nonsuch 22 is a small recreational keelboat, built predominantly of fiberglass. It has a catboat rig, an unstayed mast, with a wishbone boom, a plumb stem, a square transom, an internally-mounted spade-type rudder controlled by a wheel and a fixed fin keel. It displaces  and carries  of ballast.

The wishbone boom fulfills the role of a traditional boom and vang, as the angled wishbone cane be tensioned downwards to maintain sail shape when sailing downwind. The wishbone boom also provides additional head clearance for the crew.

The boat is fitted with an  Westerbeke diesel engine or a  outboard motor for docking and maneuvering.

The design has a large cabin for a 22-foot boat, including an enclosed head and a small galley. During production the boat went through a re-design to correct deficiencies that had resulted from scaling the 22 down from the original 30-foot design. In giving it stand-up headroom, the original 22 was too tall for its beam and the headroom and overall coach house height was reduced in later versions produced.

The design has a PHRF racing average handicap of 240 with a high of 252 and low of 225.

Operational history

In a review for Boats.com, Steve Killing, noted, "The original 22, of which almost 50 were produced, followed the tried and tested Nonsuch formula - a huge interior, standing headroom and high price tag. While the prescription for success worked flawlessly on the larger boats, the 22 had a few problems of scale that were corrected during manufacture of the boat into the late '80s...As with most boats this size, the market the original 22 found itself in was mainly composed of first-time buyers with little knowledge to let them justify the 22's price. I was amazed when Mark Ellis reminded me that the original 22 had an enclosed head and full galley. No wonder the price and freeboard were high."

In a 2010 review Steve Henkel wrote, "the Nonsuch 22 was designed for easy daysailing or cruising for a couple. It's not exactly a full-fledged traditional catboat; the beam is not quite as wide, the hull has a fin keel rather than a centerboard, and the sail is not gaff-rigged. In fact the wishbone rig, with its “cradle lines” to contain the lowered sail, is the boat's most unique feature. The whole idea is elegant simplicity, and the rig helps to make the boat quick to get underway and easy to put to bed. Best features: With the fin keel and spade rudder, helm response is instantaneous, and the boat will turn in her own length. (This is good for manuevering around slips, but not so good when trying to hold a straight course at sea.) Finish is excellent, with all interior teak satin varnished, and cedar ceiling over the settee, The port settee can be extended to make a king-sized double if desired. Opening ports and forward hatch provide plenty of fresh air. The enclosed head has full headroom for an average sized male, rare in a 22-foot sailing vessel. Worst features: the unusual design appeals to a certain group of individualists, but not to everybody."

See also
List of sailing boat types

Related development
Nonsuch 26

Similar sailboats
Buccaneer 220
Catalina 22
Capri 22
DS-22
Edel 665
Falmouth Cutter 22
Hunter 22
J/22
Marlow-Hunter 22
Marshall 22
Pearson Electra
Pearson Ensign
Ranger 22
Santana 22
Seaward 22
Spindrift 22
Starwind 223
Tanzer 22
Triton 22
US Yachts US 22

References

External links

Keelboats
1980s sailboat type designs
Sailing yachts
Trailer sailers
Sailboat type designs by Mark Ellis
Sailboat types built by Hinterhoeller Yachts